

First round selections

The following are the first round picks in the 1977 Major League Baseball draft.

Other notable selections

* Did not sign

Background 
The White Sox surprised some when they passed on right-handed pitcher Bill Gullickson, a native of nearby Orland Park, IL, and selected outfielder Harold Baines as the number one pick in the draft. White Sox owner Bill Veeck had seen Baines play little league baseball in Maryland and had followed his progress through the years. After spending three seasons in the minors, Baines was a fixture in the White Sox lineup for 10 seasons.

With Gullickson available, Montreal selected the pitcher second overall, and eventually pitcher Scott Sanderson in the third round and outfielder Tim Raines in the fifth.

Shortstop Tom Goffena from Sidney, Ohio became the Toronto Blue Jays' first draft pick as he was chosen 25th in the first round. The Seattle Mariners picked 26th and took outfielder Dave Henderson from Dos Palos, CA as their first draft pick. The Blue Jays also picked Danny Ainge out of Brigham Young University in the 15th round. Ainge, who was also drafted by the NBA's Boston Celtics, later quit baseball for a career in basketball as a player, coach and executive.

External links 
 Complete draft list from The Baseball Cube database

Notes 

Draft
Major League Baseball draft